Olimar may refer to:
Captain Olimar, protagonist of the Pikmin video game series
Río Olimar in Uruguay